Herbert Dixon may refer to:

 Herbert Dixon (rugby union) (1869–1952), Scottish rugby union player
 Herbert Dixon, 1st Baron Glentoran (1880–1950), Northern Ireland Unionist politician
 Herbert Dixon (Louisiana politician) (born 1949), member of the Louisiana House of Representatives
 Herbert Dixon (golfer), African-American golfer
 Rap Dixon (Herbert Allen Dixon, 1902–1944), American baseball player

See also
 Alfred Herbert Dixon (1857–1920), English industrialist